Gerard Anthony (Gerry) Kandelaars is an Australian politician. He was appointed to the South Australian Legislative Council for the South Australian Branch of the Australian Labor Party on 13 September 2011 to replace outgoing member Paul Holloway. He served until his resignation in February 2017.

Early life
Kandelaars was born in Australia after his Dutch parents Leo and Nelly left the Netherlands after World War II.

Kandelaars worked in the telecommunications industry for over 20 years, including as a telecommunications tradesman with the PMG Department and Principal Technical Officer in Telstra's Forward Planning Section. He moved to the role of state branch secretary and then branch president of the Communications, Electrical and Plumbing Union's T&S Branch. He was a board member of PEER VEET (a Group Training Company and Registered Training Organisation), and on the Information Industries Training Advisory Board, as well as the Electrotechnology and Water Skills Board. He was also a director on the Board of Telstra Super, Australia's largest corporate superannuation fund with over $11 billion in funds under management and was a member of its Audit, Risk and Management Committee and its Remuneration Committee.

Politics
Kandelaars previously worked for Labor MP Robyn Geraghty. He gained Labor preselection to the Legislative Council in a joint sitting of the Parliament of South Australia on 13 September 2011 to replace outgoing MLC Paul Holloway.

A moderate member of the Labor Right faction, he advocates gay rights.

Kandelaars has expressed dismay at prejudice towards migrants in South Australian society and condemned Liberal Senator Cory Bernardi for his support of Dutch far-right politician Geert Wilders.

Kandelaars affirmed his commitment to the union movement, saying "I am still a member of the union today and proud of the difference it and other unions have made and continue to make to the lives of ordinary workers. Despite the thinking of some in this place, unions continue to play an important role in our society".

Kandelaars resigned from parliament on 17 February 2017 to care for his sick wife, which created a casual vacancy and subsequent appointment. The vacancy was filled by Justin Hanson.

Personal life
Kandelaars is married to Glenys and has two adult children.

References

External links
Parliamentary Profile: SA Parliament website
Parliamentary Profile: SA Labor website

Members of the South Australian Legislative Council
Living people
Australian Labor Party members of the Parliament of South Australia
21st-century Australian politicians
Year of birth missing (living people)